Wanluan Township is a rural township in Pingtung County, Taiwan. The township is famed for its braised ham hock dish.

Geography

Administrative divisions

The township comprises 14 villages: Chengde, Chishan, Jiahe, Jiazuo, Liuhuang, Luliao, Sigou, Wanhe, Wanjin, Wanluan, Wanquan, Wugou, Xincuo and Xinzhi.

Tourist attractions
The township is famed for its braised ham hock dish. This local dish became nationally known after President Chiang Ching-kuo enjoyed them during a visit in 1981. The local delicacy is only prepared from the front feet of the pig and is marinated in medicinal herbs.

 Dapeng Round-the-Bay Bikeway
 Wanchin Basilica of the Immaculate Conception
 Wukou Village Liou Family Ancestral Hall

Notable natives
 Lo Chih-ming, member of Legislative Yuan (2002-2008)

Sister city relations
 – Kamikoani, Akita, Japan

References

External links
 Wanluan Township Office 
 

Townships in Pingtung County